Barrage is the fifth album led by jazz pianist Paul Bley. The album was recorded by Bley's quintet in 1964, released by ESP-Disk, and features saxophonist Marshall Allen in a rare appearance outside the band of Sun Ra.

Reception

Allmusic gave the album four stars, calling it "a lost free jazz classic". Reviewing the 2009 re-release, All About Jazz stated "Barrage is a gem from the ESP-Disk archives; an important document in the progress of contemporary music, as fresh today as the day it was first performed" The Penguin Guide to Jazz said, "much of the interest in the album, which like its successor consists entirely of Carla Bley tunes, is in hearing Johnson and Allen in a small group context. The music is fairly hard-edged and the presence of two such confrontational players (the trumpeter was to appear on Coltrane's Ascension) gives the set an uncomfortable fiery complexion that tends to singe away its more subtle moments".

Track listing
All compositions by Carla Bley
 "Batterie" - 4:19
 "Ictus" - 5:24
 "And Now the Queen" - 4:21
 "Around Again" - 4:15
 "Walking Woman" - 4:18
 "Barrage" - 5:31

Personnel 
 Paul Bley – piano
 Dewey Johnson – trumpet
 Marshall Allen – alto saxophone
 Eddie Gómez – double bass
 Milford Graves – percussion

References 

1965 albums
Paul Bley albums
ESP-Disk albums